Shuangsi Tropical Viviparous Forest is a forest reserve in Meinong District, Kaohsiung, Taiwan.

History
It was established in 1935 by the Japanese colonial authorities, who imported and nurtured 270 plant and tree species from different parts of Asia, Australia, and South America, in order to learn which species could thrive in Taiwan.

Geology
The forest spans over 7.65 hectares in area and is managed by the Council of Agriculture Forestry Bureau. Now 96 different tree species grow in the forest; eleven are represented by a single specimen. In a few cases, these exotics and the only trees of their kind surviving anywhere in Taiwan. The forest, around 100 meters above sea level, gets 2,000 to 3,000 millimeters of rain a year.

See also
 Geography of Taiwan

References

Nature conservation in Taiwan
Forests of Taiwan
Geography of Kaohsiung
Protected areas of Taiwan
Tourist attractions in Kaohsiung